Shree FM (ශ්රී FM), is a Shinhla-language radio station owned by EAP Broadcasting Company.

The station commenced its operations in 1992 as FM99 under the company of Colombo Communication LTD (CCL) as the first privately owned radio station in Sri Lanka One of the key people of the company at that time was a veteran broadcaster named Livi Wijemanne. The ownership of CCL was transferred to VANIK INC. and then to E.A.P. Edirisingha (Pvt) Ltd. During the management of VANIK INC. they changed the channel's name to 'SAWANA RADIO' under the guidance of Jackson Antony. When E.A.P took over CCL they renamed as Shree FM in 1998. E.A.P. Edirisingha (Pvt) Ltd. also owns Swarnavahini and ETV Television Channels. Its English counterpart channel being E FM is broadcast from Colombo on FM 88.3 MHz.

Shree FM was awarded as the People's Radio Channel and the People's Youth Radio Channel at the People's SLIM Awards 2007 - Sri Lanka. This radio is broadcast island wide in Sri Lanka on the frequencies 100FM and 100.2FM.

Shree FM, Ran FM and E FM's New Executive Director, is Mr. Ryan Honter.

Colombo Communications Ltd, which runs Shree and e FM have Launched a new channel named Ran Fm, CCL also won the most prestigious award in radio, The National Association of Broadcasters (NAB is based in Washington D.C) - International Broadcast Excellence Award.

See also
 E FM
 Swarnavahini
 List of radio networks in Sri Lanka

External links

Sinhala-language radio stations in Sri Lanka
EAP Networks